Yasin Mishaui (Bulgarian: Ясин Мишауи) (born 21 July 1975) is a Bulgarian former footballer of partial Arab descent.

Career

Born in Sofia, the son of a Bulgarian mother and a Sudanese father, Mishaui has played for a number of professional teams in the country, including Balkan Botevgrad, Botev Plovdiv, Belasitsa, Iskar, Conegliano German, FC Bankya, and Vitosha Bistritsa. He also had a spell in Greece. Given that he had not made appearances for Bulgarian national sides, in 2004 he received an offer to represent the national team of Sudan, but eventually this did not materialize.

He was the manager of Vitosha Bistritsa for more than 7 years, leading them to their first ever promotion to the second tier of Bulgarian football and winning Bulgaria amateur cup in 2013. He also at one point coached current Bulgarian Prime Minister Boyko Borisov. In March 2014, Nikolay Todorov replaced Mishaui at the helm of the "Bistritsa tigers".

References

1975 births
Living people
Footballers from Sofia
Bulgarian footballers
First Professional Football League (Bulgaria) players
PFC Belasitsa Petrich players
Botev Plovdiv players
Bulgarian football managers
Association football midfielders